Raneo "Ranie" Enriquez Abu (born October 28, 1970) is a Filipino politician serving as the Representative of Batangas's 2nd congressional district from 2013 to 2022. He served as the Deputy Speaker of the House of Representatives of the Philippines from 2016 until his removal on 2020.

Early life
Raneo Abu was born on May 12, 1967. He completed elementary and high school education in public schools in Bauan. In college, he took up general engineering at Batangas State University in 1984 to 1985 before shifting to political science at University of Batangas from 1986 to 1989.

Political career

Committee Support Services Division of the Philippine Senate (1990-1992)
Abu's stint in government service started in 1988 when he became a youth development assistant in the office of then-Governor Vicente Mayo. He also worked as a photocopying attendant at the Committee Support Services Division of the Senate from 1990 to 1992.

Municipal Councilor of Bauan (1992-1995)
In 1992, he ran as municipal councilor of Bauan and won. However, he served for only one term as he did not seek re-election in 1995 because his father was dying of liver cancer.

Post-municipal councilorship (1995-2013)
Instead, his father asked him to help Hermilando Mandanas, who was then running for governor in 1995. Abu served as executive assistant for Mandanas, a position that he kept until 2004 when he was appointed supervising political affairs officer in the House of Representatives under the office of Mandanas, who was then elected representative.

House of Representatives (2013-2022)
In 2013, Abu ran for representative of the 2nd district of Batangas under Nacionalista Party and won. He defeated board member and actor Christopher de Leon of the Liberal Party and Godofredo Berberabe of the United Nationalist Alliance. He was re-elected in 2016 and in 2019.

On July 10, 2020, Abu is one of the 70 representatives who voted to "yes" to deny the franchise renewal of ABS-CBN. In January 2021, Abu is announced to be part of the new bloc "BTS sa Kongreso" (named after the K-pop boy band group BTS of South Korea), a coalition group formed by Taguig–Pateros Representative and former House Speaker Alan Peter Cayetano during the 18th Congress.

Personal life
Abu is married to Maria Paz Dolor, who has worked as a domestic helper in Italy, with whom he has three children. Their eldest daughter, Maria Reina, is a physician by profession who unsuccessfully ran for representative at the 2nd district of Batangas in 2022.

On March 25, 2021, Abu tested positive for COVID-19.

References 

1967 births
Living people
Members of the House of Representatives of the Philippines from Batangas
Nacionalista Party politicians
People from Batangas
Filipino city and municipal councilors
Filipino Roman Catholics
Deputy Speakers of the House of Representatives of the Philippines